Rhododendron erosum (啮蚀杜鹃) is a species of flowering plant in the family Ericaceae, native to eastern Bhutan, southern Tibet, and southern Xizang, China, where it grows at altitudes of . The blood-red flowers are borne in a tight truss, in April and May.

References

 Notes Roy. Bot. Gard. Edinburgh 19(94): 225-226 225 1937.

erosum